Thomas Dawson (born 15 February 1942) is a British speed skater. He competed in two events at the 1964 Winter Olympics.

References

1942 births
Living people
British male speed skaters
Olympic speed skaters of Great Britain
Speed skaters at the 1964 Winter Olympics
Sportspeople from Falkirk